Duncan High School is a high school in Duncan, Arizona. It is the only high school under the jurisdiction of the Duncan Unified School District, which also includes an elementary school.

References

Public high schools in Arizona
Schools in Greenlee County, Arizona